Junas may refer to:

People
 Daniel Junas (born 1962), Slovak actor
 Junas Naciri (born 1973), Dutch football player
 Martin Junas (born 1996), Slovak football player
 Peter Junas, Slovak ice hockey player

Places
 Junas, Gard, France